Barats and Bereta was the web-based sketch comedy duo of Luke Pierre Barats and Joseph Daniel Bereta. Their viral videos have also earned them the description of an Internet phenomenon. They currently have over 395,000 subscribers on YouTube. Views of videos released in 2006 have topped over ten million and more recent videos have an average of 200,000 views. Both have portrayed characters on the popular YouTube web series The Annoying Orange.

History 
Formed in 2003, the duo originally made videos to amuse friends, often combining real and fictional acts. They met when both were students of Gonzaga University. These videos eventually made it onto their website and onto YouTube.

NBC signed them for a one-year deal in 2006. "This is Culdesac", the sketch comedy pilot they produced, directed, wrote, edited, and acted in under contract, was not picked up by NBC. However their next television project was being a more traditional sitcom. The pilot did not result in the series airing.

The Huffington Post has covered videos from the duo in multiple online publications.

In 2012, Bereta became a host on the news and current events web series, SourceFed, and would remain as a host on the channel until December 31, 2014.

In 2014, Barats and Bereta  was listed on NewMediaRockstars Top 100 Channels, ranked at 50.

In 2017, both Barats and Bereta became members of the Smosh team; Barats as a writer for Smosh sketches, while Bereta worked as a content producer.

As of April 2018, Bereta is no longer working for Smosh and is working full-time on The Valleyfolk YouTube channel and company with his friends and fellow founding SourceFed hosts Elliott Morgan and Steve Zaragoza. Barats later replaced his position. In 2019, the Valleyfolk competed on the NBC comedy competition show Bring the Funny, winning the show's first season.

References

External links 
Barats and Bereta Myspace Page

American comedy duos
American comedy troupes
American comedy writers
American sketch comedians
YouTubers from Idaho
Gonzaga University alumni
Living people
Performing groups established in 2003
Sketch comedy troupes
YouTube channels launched in 2005
Year of birth missing (living people)